Hampton School District is a public school district based in Hampton, Arkansas, United States. The school district encompasses  of land including all of Hampton and portions of several Calhoun County communities including Camden, Harrell, and Tinsman.

The district proves comprehensive education for pre-kindergarten through grade 12 is accredited by the Arkansas Department of Education (ADE).

History 
In 1965 the Calhoun County School District merged into the Hampton School District.

Schools 
 Hampton High School, serving more than 250 students in grades 7 through 12.
 Hampton Elementary School, serving more than 250 students in pre-kindergarten and 6

References

Further reading 
  (Download) - Includes maps of predecessor districts

External links 
 

School districts in Arkansas
Education in Calhoun County, Arkansas